Bhakta Prahlad is a 1946 Indian Hindi-language film.

Cast

Music
The film's music was composed by Hanuman Prasad and K. C. Verma.

"Suno Suno Hari Ki Leela" - Geeta Dutt
"Ab Jani Re Pahchani Re" - Geeta Dutt
"Kyu Door Hua Mujhse" - Shamshad Begum
"Narayan Hari" - N/A
"Mai To Nachungi" - N/A
"Anand Manaye Gaye" - N/A
"Bahar Ke Din Sajna" - N/A
"Jag Uthe Hum Jag Uthe" - Geeta Dutt
"More Raja Ka Kunj" - N/A
"Suno Suno Binti Hamari" - Geeta Dutt
"Tumhi Sansar Rachate Ho" - Shaukat Ali

References

External links
 

1946 films
1940s Hindi-language films
Films about Prahlada
Indian fantasy films
1946 fantasy films
Indian black-and-white films